Lloyd is a 2001 American comedy film. The film was released on May 4, 2001.

Plot
Lloyd is the "class clown." He often gets in trouble with teachers, one of whom is very strict. When he tries to rebel, he is put into a class for "less enthusiastic students." Once there, he joins the other students in the group: Troy, Carla, and Storm. He soon falls in love with the class's newest member, Tracy (Kristin Parker). However, she is taken by storm. When Lloyd talks to his mother, she tells him that he can still win her back by being himself.

The role of Lloyd is played by Todd Bosley. Tom Arnold, a friend of the producers, played a small role.

Cast
Todd Bosley - Lloyd 
Brendon Ryan Barrett - Troy 
Mary Mara - Joann
Chloe Peterson - Carla 
Sammy Elliott - Nathan 
Patrick Higgins - Storm 
Kristin Parker - Tracy
Tom Arnold - Tom 
Taylor Negron - Mr. Weid

Production
The film was shot in Sunnyvale, California, in 1997.

External links

2001 films
American comedy-drama films
2001 comedy-drama films
2001 comedy films
2001 drama films
2000s English-language films
2000s American films